The Hrabišici (singular: Hrabišic) were an important North Bohemian aristocratic family, that was also known as the lords of Osek or of Osek and Riesenburg (Czech: z Oseka) but were also named von Riesenburg after their castle, the Riesenburg. The history of the family goes back to the 11th century. The family fell on hard times in the 15th century and died out in the early 16th century.

Genealogy of important members of the line of Riesenburg and Osek

Not fully traced 
 Všebor I (died before 1061), was presumably an important figure  in Bohemia at that time. From the papers of King Vratislav II it can be inferred that a certain Všebor gifted the village of Lodín to Břevnov Monastery. 
 Všebor II (died before 1073)
 Kojata, is mentioned in the years 1061 to 1068 as governor of the castle of Bílina and the district of Bilina. In the following 35 years there are no more entries in the historic documents about other individuals.
 Hrabeš the Great also  Hrabeš I (died 1158), was from 1103 to 1109 Great Chamberlain of  Bořivoj II, Duke of Bohemia
 Unknown member of the House of Hrabischitz
 Heralt Gerardus (died 1122) (for continuation see “Traced genealogies”)
 Vschebor III de Vinarec, mentioned 1172
 Grabissa II (Hrabiš II), von 1180 to at the latest 1183 Great Chamberlain (born about 1120; (died 6 November 1197)
 Kojata III, Vizekämmerer 1185–1187
 Olen, mentioned 1121
 Boresch (Boreš), mentioned 1091
 Olen, mentioned vor 1091

Traced genealogies 
 Heralt Gerardus or Kojata III
 Grabissa III (Hrabiš III) (died 1197), höchster Kämmerer 1188–1189, and 1191–1197
 Grabissa IV (Hrabiš IV) (died about 1197) 
 Kojata IV also  Kojata of Brüx (Kojata z Mostu) (died 1228), 1207 mentioned as Unterkellner, married Vratislava  
 Vschebor IV (of Schwabenitz), also Svebor von Schwabenitz, Všebor IV ze Švábenic (died about 1224), mentioned from 1190 
 Svatochna, mentioned 1234–1258, married Slavibor of Drnovice
 Euphemie (Eufémie), mentioned from 1232 to 1268
 Slauko der Große (Slávek Veliký also  Slávek I) (died 1226). At the end of the 12th century he authorised the foundation of the Cistercian abbey of Ossegg.
 Grabissa V (Hrabiš V), mentioned 1197–1203
 Bohuslav I of Hrabišic (born about 1180; died 1241), Königlicher Kämmerer
 Slauko III (Slavek III) (died before 28 February 1250 in Ossegg) (1234 to 1240 Abbot of  Ossegg, then until 1249 Abbot of Prussia with seat in Marienwerder)
 Boreš of Rýzmburk (also Bohuslav II de Riesenburg) (born about 1201; died before 1278)
 Boresch I (Boreš I) (died before 1207, mentioned 1188
 Slauko II (Slavek II), mentioned 1207–1209
 Odolen, mentioned 1224–1238
 Bohuslav, mentioned 1232–1234
 Odolen of Chyše (Odolen von Chiesch), mentioned 1254–1289

References

Literature 
 800 let klástera vo Oseku (1196–1996)
 Velímský, Tomáš: Hrabišici páni z Rýzmburka 

Hrabišici